Shim Dal-gi (Korean: 심달기; born on 12 June 1999) is a South Korean child actress. She made her acting debut in 2018 and since then she has appeared in a number of films and television series. She is most well known for her role in the film Snowball (2020) and Kakao TV's original Shadow Beauty (2021). She also appeared in the Netflix original series The School Nurse Files (2020) and Juvenile Justice (2022). In 2022 she appeared in the omnibus TV series Our Blues.

Career
Shim made her debut as a director at the age of 18 in the film Nobody's Subconscious and Realm, released in 2016.

Shim Dal-gi made her acting debut in 2018 in the TV series Feel Good to Die, and short film Dong-a for which she was awarded the Jury's Special Award for the Actor at Mise-en-scène Short Film Festival.

In 2021 Shim was cast in Kakao TV's original web drama Shadow Beauty as a main cast member. She got recognition after appearing in TV series Hospital Playlist  and Netflix original The School Nurse Files (2020), and films Dust-Man and Snowball (2021). She was nominated for the Baeksang Arts Award for Best Supporting Actress – Film at the 58th Baeksang Arts Awards for her role as Ah-ram in Snowball.

In 2022, she is gaining popularity for her role as the young version of Jeong Eun-hee (Lee Jung-eun) in tvN series Our Blues. Her portrayal of a shy high school girl and "her various expressions and emotional performances that change depending on the situation" were appreciated.

Modelling

In 2021 she appeared in an advertisement for 'Baedal People' and cosmetics company 'Astra'. She was crowned 'Advertising Fairy'.

Filmography

Films

Television series

Web series

Awards and nominations

References

External links
 Official website
 
 Shim Dal-gi on Kmdb
 Shim Dal-gi on Daum 

Living people
1999 births
South Korean child actresses
Actresses from Seoul
21st-century South Korean actresses
South Korean film actresses
South Korean television actresses
South Korean web series actresses